OLC is a three-letter initialism (TLA) that may refer to:

 Oak leaf cluster, a military decoration
 Office of Legal Counsel in the U.S. Department of Justice
 Ohio Library Council, professional association for librarians in Ohio
 Online Contest (gliding), a glider, hang glider, and paraglider soaring competition
 Online creation, a software feature in MUDs that allows editing the world while interacting with it
Online Learning Consortium, a professional organization promoting online education
 Open Location Code, a system for identifying a place on Earth
 Open-loop controller, a system controller that does not use feedback
 Optical lattice clock, a type of optical atomic clock
 The Oriental Land Company

See also

 OLCS (Our Lady's Convent School), Loughborough, Leicestershire, England, UK
 Olcs (village), Vața de Jos Commune, Hunedoara County, Transylvania Region, Romania